Frederick Mair (15 April 1901 – 25 December 1959) was an Australian cricketer. He played twenty-two first-class matches for New South Wales between 1933/34 and 1937/38.

See also
 List of New South Wales representative cricketers

References

External links
 

1901 births
1959 deaths
Australian cricketers
New South Wales cricketers
Cricketers from Sydney